Jaime Sánchez (born 17 July 1927) is a Bolivian former sports shooter. He competed at the 1972 Summer Olympics and the 1976 Summer Olympics.

References

External links
 

1927 births
Possibly living people
Bolivian male sport shooters
Olympic shooters of Bolivia
Shooters at the 1972 Summer Olympics
Shooters at the 1976 Summer Olympics
Place of birth missing (living people)